The 2003–04 season saw Hull City compete in the Football League Third Division where they finished in 2nd position with 88 points, gaining automatic promotion to League One.

Final league table

Results
Hull City's score comes first

Legend

Football League Third Division

FA Cup

Football League Cup

Football League Trophy

Squad statistics

References

External links
 Hull City 2003–04 at Soccerbase.com (select relevant season from dropdown list)

Hull City A.F.C. seasons
Hull City
2000s in Kingston upon Hull